I'm a Rebel is the second studio album by German heavy metal band Accept, recorded in 1979 and released in 1980 (see 1980 in music). It was the first of three consecutive Accept records to utilize Dirk Steffens as producer. The album finds Accept continuing to search for their musical direction, experimenting with a more commercial sound than on their debut. Bassist Peter Baltes once again sings lead vocals on two tracks, the slower-paced songs "No Time to Lose" and "The King".

The title track is credited to George Alexander, which is a pseudonym for Alex Young, eldest brother of record producer and musician George Young and AC/DC guitarists Angus Young and Malcolm Young. Guitarist Wolf Hoffmann recalled the circumstances that led Alex Young to work with Accept: "He got involved with Accept through the producer. Everybody after the first record said we have to have a radio hit. 'Guys you need a radio hit and we have just the song for you. Why don't you try this here?'" The song became the basis for the band's first music video.

Lead singer Udo Dirkschneider believes that the album "wasn't too inspired. I think because of some unsuccessful experiments, the band wasn't too solid and the identity wasn't discovered yet." He also blamed "too many people involved trying to manipulate the band, just like on the first album." Accept would become determined to resolve these deficiencies on their next album, Breaker.

I'm a Rebel gained international distribution in the United Kingdom and United States on the Logo and Passport labels, respectively. These international versions both depict a sword hilt on the cover, a more identifiably "heavy metal" image than the original German cover, which has a doorway-type shape encasing the band members superimposed on a picture of a crowded city street. The Passport version simply titles the record Accept, as the band's 1979 self-titled debut had not been released in America.

Track listing

Credits
Band members
Udo Dirkschneider – vocals
Wolf Hoffmann – guitars
Jörg Fischer – guitars
Peter Baltes – bass guitar, lead vocals on "No Time to Lose", "The King" and the bridge of "Save Us"
Stefan Kaufmann – drums

Production
Dirk Steffens – producer for Delta-Studio Productions, arrangements with Accept
Christoph Bonno – engineer, mixing
Manfred Schunke – engineer on "I Wanna Be No Hero"
René Tinner – mixing on "I'm a Rebel"
Cover design by Fessel/Hoffmann
Published by Oktave, Hamburg

References

1980 albums
Accept (band) albums
Brain Records albums
Albums produced by Dirk Steffens